

Location 

Geetanjali Enclave is a colony in the southern part of Delhi, India. It is next to the Shivalik colony. Geetanjali colony is a cooperative residential society Colony with registered office at C-9 Geetanjali and with approx 174 members were allotted residential plots. The colony has secured Entry from three gates, one from Saket and two gates at Shivalik Road. the colony has its own Local Shopping Complex now converted in the office of some multinational company. Houses of many renowned Politician like Dr. Yoganand Shastriji(INC), Dr. Nandini Sharma(BJP), Businessmen like Somdutt Builders, Angad Batra, and Vishal Jhunjhunwala, Lawyers like Rohinton Fali Nariman, Cardiologist Dr. Ashok Seth, Astrologer Pandit Madan Mohan Sharma, Deep/Future House DJ Raghav Mehta and High-end car modifier Prashant Khandelwal to take the name of few. The colony with the affluent class of people lives with respect for everyone. Almost every festival is celebrated in the Mandir or in Geetanjali Club.

Places of interest
Banks:
Punjab National Bank, A Block.
HDFC Bank in B Block.
ATM's Near by, almost of every bank

Markets:
Geetanjali STC MMTC Market
Navjeevan Vihar Market
Malviya Nagar Market nearly 2 km from Geetanjali
Select City Mall 3 km From Geetanjali Enclave
DLF Mall
MGF Mall

Entertainment:
PVR Anupam at Saket
PVR at Select city Mall
DT Cinema at DLF Mall
Skiing facility at MGF mall

Hospitals:
MAX Hospital
G.M Modi Hospital
Neptune Hospital

Coffee Shops:
Both Barista Lavazza and Cafe Coffee Day
Turquoise Cottage
Days of Raj

Transportation

The nearest metro station is Malviya Nagar at yellow line. D.T.C buses which pass by the periphery of Geetanjali Enclave. Bus routes passing are 512, 501, 548, 680.

Highlights 

 Ram Temple - Geetanjali Enclave has a Ram temple in its premises, where all Hindu festivals are celebrated. 
 Green Area - Geetanjali has four parks where many local birds—such as doves, mynas, and owls—can be seen. 
 Geetanjali has its own club, with a basketball court, football field, and badminton court, as well as a lawn tennis facility run by a professional group.

Nearby

Sightseeing 

 Qutub Minar - 2 km
 Chattarpur Temple - 4 km

Neighbourhoods in Delhi